Jim  "Jay" Washington (October 13, 1951 – June 24, 2018) was an American professional football player who played as a running back for the Winnipeg Blue Bombers. He was named CFL All-Star two times, in 1976 and 1977, and both times he won the Eddie James Memorial Trophy. Washington finished his career with 6127 yards rushing.

References

1951 births
2018 deaths
African-American players of American football
American football running backs
American players of Canadian football
Canadian football running backs
Clemson Tigers football players
Sportspeople from Charleston, South Carolina
Saskatchewan Roughriders players
Winnipeg Blue Bombers players